Weak neutral current interactions are one of the ways in which subatomic particles can interact by means of the weak force.  These interactions are mediated by the Z boson. The discovery of weak neutral currents was a significant step toward the unification of electromagnetism and the weak force into the electroweak force, and led to the discovery of the W and Z bosons.

In simple terms 
The weak force is  best known for its role in nuclear decay. It has very short range but (apart from gravity) is the only force to interact with neutrinos. Like other subatomic forces, the weak force is mediated via exchange particles. Perhaps the most well known of the exchange particles for the weak force is the W particle which is involved in beta decay. W particles have electric charge – there are both positive and negative W particles – however the Z boson is also an exchange particle for the weak force but does not have any electrical charge.

Exchange of a Z boson transfers momentum, spin, and energy, but leaves the interacting particles' quantum numbers unaffected – charge, flavor, baryon number, lepton number, etc. Because there is no transfer of electrical charge involved, exchange of Z particles is referred to as "neutral" in the phrase "neutral current". However the word "current" here has nothing to do with electricity – it simply refers to the exchange of the Z particle.

The Z boson's neutral current interaction is determined by a derived quantum number called weak charge, which acts similarly to weak isospin for interactions with the W bosons.

Definition 
The neutral current that gives the interaction its name is that of the interacting particles.

For example, the neutral current contribution to the  →  elastic scattering amplitude is

where the neutral currents describing the flow of the neutrino and of the electron are given by:

where:
 
These couplings amount to  essentially left chiral for neutrinos and axial for charged leptons.

The Z boson can couple to any Standard Model particle, except gluons and photons. However, any interaction between two charged particles that can occur via the exchange of a virtual Z boson can also occur via the exchange of a virtual photon. Unless the interacting particles have energies on the order of the Z boson mass (91 GeV) or higher, the virtual Z boson exchange has an effect of a tiny correction to the amplitude of the electromagnetic process.

Particle accelerators with energies necessary to observe neutral current interactions and to measure the mass of Z boson weren't available until 1983.

On the other hand, Z boson interactions involving neutrinos have distinctive signatures: They provide the only known mechanism for elastic scattering of neutrinos in matter; neutrinos are almost as likely to scatter elastically (via Z boson exchange) as inelastically (via W boson exchange), of major experimental significance, in, e.g. , the   Sudbury Neutrino Observatory experiment.

Weak neutral currents were predicted by electroweak theory developed mainly by Abdus Salam, John Clive Ward, Sheldon Glashow and Steven Weinberg, and confirmed shortly thereafter in 1973, in a neutrino experiment in the Gargamelle bubble chamber at CERN.

See also 
 Charged current
 Electric current
 Flavor changing neutral current
 Quantum chromodynamics
 Sudbury Neutrino Observatory#Neutral current interaction
 Weak charge

References

External links 
 
 
 
 
 
 
 
 

Electroweak theory